Gangneung Yoo clan is one of the Korean clans. Their Bon-gwan was in Gangneung. According to the research held in 2000, the number of Gangneung Yoo clan was 178913. Their founder was  who came from Northern Song Dynasty. According to their family tree,  was an Emperor Gaozu of Han's 41st descendant.  worked as minister of defense (兵部尚書, Bingbu Shangshu) in Northern Song Dynasty during Emperor Shenzong of Song's reign. However, he was ousted by Wang Anshi because he was a member of old policies party. As a result, he fled Goryeo.

See also 
 Korean clan names of foreign origin

References

External links 
 

 
Yu clans
Korean clan names of Chinese origin